R. Papa station is an elevated Manila Light Rail Transit (LRT) station situated on Line 1. The station serves Tondo in Manila and is located on Rizal Avenue Extension in Barangay Obrero, Tondo.  The station is named after Ricardo Papa Street. The station is the first station in Rizal Avenue Extension going north and the last station in the city of Manila.

R. Papa station serves as the fifth station for Line 1 trains headed to Baclaran and as the sixteenth station for trains headed to Roosevelt.

Transportation links
Commuters can take the many jeepneys or taxis to R. Papa station. Buses that ply the Taft Avenue route also stop near the station. Cycle rickshaws are available outside the station.

See also
List of rail transit stations in Metro Manila
Manila Light Rail Transit System

Manila Light Rail Transit System stations
Railway stations opened in 1985
Buildings and structures in Tondo, Manila
1985 establishments in the Philippines